Black on Black is an album by American country music artist Waylon Jennings, released on RCA Victor in 1982.

Background
By 1981, Jennings excessive lifestyle had caught up to him financially.  Despite a string of #1 albums and sellout concerts, the overhead of keeping his show on the road combined with his cocaine habit had drained nearly all of his resources.  In the audio version of his autobiography Waylon, he admitted to spending up to $1,500 a day on the drug and also confessed to being out of touch with the personnel on his tours:

"The tours were runnin' well into the red.  People were hanging out and gettin' paid for it.  We had close to fifty bodies on our payroll, and I was not sure of what any of 'em were doing.  There were at least twenty more people than we needed on the crew, and if I saw somebody twice in a week, I'd ask Richie [Albright], 'Are they workin' for us?'...For every million dollars I was takin' in, I was spending two million."

In the spring of 1981, Jennings, drummer Richie Albright, and financial advisor Bill Robinson went over the singer's business affairs at a hotel in Los Angeles and found that he owed more than two million dollars and was over $800,000 overdrawn to the bank. Jennings slowly crawled out of debt by trimming down his organization and touring heavily, including a lucrative engagement in Las Vegas.   Unfortunately, Jennings' money woes came at a time when his health and creativity were flagging primarily due to his continued reliance on cocaine.

Recording and composition
Jennings reunited with Chips Moman for Black on Black, recording the album at Moman's studio in Nashville.  Jennings and Moman had previously collaborated on one of the singers biggest LPs, 1977's Ol' Waylon, and the producer had co-written what turned out to be the biggest single of Jennings' career, "Luckenbach, Texas (Back to the Basics of Love)."  Moman had also just produced the phenomenally successful Willie Nelson album Always on My Mind.   On Ol' Waylon, Moman had introduced a slicker sound without sacrificing the grit that was at the heart of Jennings' music, but Black on Black features a different sound than most Jennings albums of the period, prominently including electric pianos and backing vocals, the latter performed primarily by Jennings' wife, Jessi Colter.   In his AllMusic review of Black on Black, Thom Jurek criticizes the over-production and Moman in particular:

"On virtually every track, Jennings' voice seems to come out of a tunnel, someplace out of time and space, as if his ghost were singing these songs. The laid-back angle Jennings was trying to show here is perhaps overwrought, with electric pianos covering for electric guitars...Jennings is as inspired as he could be, but Moman ruined this set with his trademark over-production." 

The album's big hit was "Just to Satisfy You," recorded as a duet with Willie Nelson.  The song had originally been a regional hit for Jennings in Arizona in 1964 and helped bring him to the attention of RCA.  Jennings had also recorded the song as the title track for a 1969 LP.  Although Jennings remained a strong presence on the country charts at this time, Nelson had eclipsed him - and just about everybody else in country music - and it was likely due to his name that the song became a #1 hit, rather than any appeal of the flagging outlaw country movement.  The album would also produce two other Top 5 singles, both written by Jennings: "Shine," which reached #4, and "Women Do Know How to Carry On," which topped out at #5.  The song "Shine" appears in the 1981 film The Pursuit of D. B. Cooper.  As on his most recent LPs, Jennings relied on well known covers to round out the album, including Johnny Cash's "Folsom Prison Blues" (which he had recorded on his 1968 album Jewels) and Hank Williams' "Honky Tonk Blues."  Perhaps the album's most moving performance is Jennings' rendition of "Song for the Life," originally recorded by Rodney Crowell, who also composed the tune.  Thom Jurek praises the song: "The acoustic piano and electric guitar fills, showcased by a gorgeous acoustic solo, would have been a stunning end to this record, but it was not to be - even if it is the strongest thing here and leaves Crowell's own version in the dust." Instead, the album closes with the Bobby Emmons' brazen "Get Naked With Me," which Jurek deems "a stupid song in the old, tired outlaw frame."  Emmons and Moman, who wrote "Luckenbach, Texas," contribute two songs to Black on Black: "May I Borrow Some Sugar from You" and "(We Made It as Lovers) We Just Couldn't Make It as Friends."

Reception
Despite mixed reviews, Black on Black was another commercial success for Jennings, reaching #3 on the Billboard country albums chart and making the Top 40 on the pop albums chart.  Amazon.com: "From the dark cover on down, the sound here was reflective of the time, using production methods that tried to make the studio experience sound more like the live experience...in this case, with mixed results."

Track listing
"Women Do Know How to Carry On" (Bobby Emmons, Jennings) – 3:17
"Honky Tonk Blues" (Hank Williams) – 2:42
"Just to Satisfy You" (Don Bowman, Jennings) – 2:48
"(We Made It as Lovers) We Just Couldn't Make It as Friends" (Bobby Emmons, Chips Moman) – 2:12
"Shine" (Jennings) – 2:49
"Folsom Prison Blues" (Johnny Cash) – 2:40
"Gonna Write a Letter" (Paul Kennerley) – 2:35
"May I Borrow Some Sugar from You" (Bobby Emmons, Chips Moman) – 3:21
"Song for the Life" (Rodney Crowell) – 3:39
"Get Naked With Me" (Bobby Emmons) – 3:13

Production
Producer: Chips Moman
Liner Photo: Catrina O'Brian

Personnel
Pickers: Waylon Jennings, Chips Moman, Bobby Emmons, Johnny Christopher, Ralph Mooney, Jerry Bridges, Reggie Young, Gary Scruggs, Jerry Gropp, Bobby Wood, Gene Christman, Tommy Cogbill, Mike Leech
Singers: Waylon Jennings, Jessi Colter, Toni Wine, Chips Moman, Johnny Christopher, Gary Scruggs, Jerry Gropp, Willie Nelson

Charts

Weekly charts

Year-end charts

References

1982 albums
Waylon Jennings albums
RCA Records albums
Albums produced by Chips Moman